Peter Lester (born in Christchurch) is a New Zealand sailor and broadcaster.

Sailing career
In 1977 he was the World Champion in the OK class. He was named the NZ Yachtsman of the Year in 1977 and again in 1987.

Lester joined New Zealand Challenge for the 1988 America's Cup where he was the tactician on board KZ1.

He coached the Spanish Desafio España Copa America challenge at the 1992 Louis Vuitton Cup. In 1993 he was the helmsman on Willi Illbruck's Pinta, which won the One Ton Cup.

He sailed in the 1995 Louis Vuitton Cup as part of Tag Heuer Challenge.

He competed in the 2017 World Masters Games in a Laser.

Broadcasting career
Lester's broadcasting career began in 1992. After Desafio España Copa America was eliminated for the Louis Vuitton Cup, Lester was asked to commentate for TVNZ. He has subsequently commentated on other America's Cup and Volvo Ocean Races.

References

Living people
Sportspeople from Christchurch
New Zealand male sailors (sport)
New Zealand broadcasters
Sports commentators
1988 America's Cup sailors
1995 America's Cup sailors
Year of birth missing (living people)
World champions in sailing for New Zealand
OK class world champions
OK class sailors